Kinderhook is an unincorporated community located in Madison and Greene counties, Virginia, United States.

References

Unincorporated communities in Virginia
Unincorporated communities in Madison County, Virginia
Unincorporated communities in Greene County, Virginia